The Latin Bishopric of Argos (lit. "Argolic Diocese"; also  and  — "Argo Diocese" and "Argive Diocese") is a former Latin Church episcopal see in the Argolid in southern Greece, formed with the establishment of the Crusader States, and suffragan to the Latin Archbishop of Corinth. For part of its history it totally supplanted the local Greek Orthodox episcopal administration (the mediaeval Metropolis of Argos and Nauplia, now called the Metropolis of Argolis) and at other times existed in competition with it. At various times in its history it had no incumbent bishop. It was finally suppressed in 1715 and exists now as a Catholic titular see.

Frankish rule
Under Frankish Crusader rule, Argos was part of the Lordship of Argos and Nauplia, and became a Latin Church bishopric in 1212. It lasted as a residential see until Argos was taken by the Ottoman Empire in 1463, but would be revived under the second Venetian rule in 1686. In the meantime, the Venetians retained Nauplia until 1540, when it was lost in the Third Ottoman Venetian War. Until then, at least some of the nominal bishops of Argos resided at Nauplia; afterwards in Venice. The Orthodox bishop returned to Argos during this interval.

Known Latin bishops during this period were:;; 

John
Bernard
Nicholas (30 April 1311)
Nicholas, Augustinian Order (O.E.S.A.) (1324.12.17 – ?), previously Bishop of Roman Catholic Diocese of Drivasto (1323.02.28 – 1324.12.17)
John (4 Sept 1334)
Ventur(in)us
 Nicholas of Offida, Friars Minor (O.F.M.) (1358.12.10 – ?), previously Bishop of Butrinto (? – 1349.06.15), Bishop of Belcastro (1349.06.15 – 1358.12.10)
James Petri (Pigalordi)
Matthew
Nicholas of Langres
John
Conrad Flader
Secundus Nani
Francesco Pavoni (1425.05.14 – ?), previously Bishop of Kotor (Montenegro) (1422.10.02 – 1434)
Bartholemew 
Mark de Carmello
Mark Taruello
William Militis
Augustine, abbot of the Monastery of Saint Leonard, from 1499 coadjutor with right of succession with Tryphon Gabriel
Tryphon Gabriel (14 January 1499, - ?)
Paul Zabarella (20 March 1504 - ?)
John,  (7 November 1509 - ?) Dubious, it is possible that he should be listed as titular only
Francis Tynemouth (1512) 
Jermoe de Sanctis (1513)
Calixtus de Amadeis (20 April 1514) Doctor of both laws
James Rota (10 April 1540) Suffragan to Padua; non-resident
Gerard Busdragi (24 August 1552)
Jerome William (7 March 1563) Suffragan to Padua; present at the Council of Trent)
Leander Garuffi (Rotelli) de Piis (15 January 1574) Was permitted by Pope Paul IV to be coadjutor with his brother, it is disputed whether he held a doctorate

Venetian Rule
There was a Catholic church hierarchy in Argos and Nauplia at this time, which compelled the Greek Orthodox Metropolis of Argos and Nauplia to relocate to the village of Merbaka, further east.

 ? (1686- ?)

Titular see
Today, Argos is listed by the Catholic Church as a titular see   since the diocese was nominally restored as a Latin Catholic titular bishopric in the 17th century. It has been vacant for decades, having had the following incumbents, all of the fitting episcopal (lowest) rank :

 Stanisław Udrzycki (1617.12.04 – 1621.10)
 Louis du Chaine (1618.04.02 – 1623.02)
 Franciszek Zajerski (1622.02.21 – 1631)
 Stanisław Łoza (1634.06.12 – 1639)
 Mikołaj Krasicki (1639.10.03 – 1652)
 Maciej Bystram (1659.09.22 – 1677.08.05)
 Bernardino della Chiesa (伊大仁), Friars Minor (O.F.M.), Chinese missionary (1680.03.20 – 1690.04.10)
 Polikarp Antoni Augustyn Marciejewski (1819.06.04 – 1827.10.19)
 Bernardo Antonio De Riso, Benedictines (O.S.B.) (1883.08.09 – 1883.08.23)
 Francesco Benassi (1884.11.10 – 1892.03.15)
 Joaquim Arcoverde de Albuquerque Cavalcanti (1892.08.26 – 1894.08.19) (later Cardinal)
 Antonio Valbonesi (1899.06.05 – 1901.04.15)
 António Moutinho (1901.08.18 – 1904.11.14)
 Andrea Caron (1905.08.25 – 1908.01.08) (later Archbishop)
 Amando Agostino Bahlmann, O.F.M. (1908.07.10 – 1939.03.05)
 Oreste Rauzi (1939.06.17 – 1973.02.02)
 Bernardo Gerardo Hilhorst, Holy Ghost Fathers (C.S.Sp.) (1953.12.12 – 1954.08.11)
 Johann Aloys Schneider (1801.01.29 – 1818.12.22)

References

Principality of Achaea
Titular sees in Europe
Former Roman Catholic dioceses in Greece
Latin Bishopric of Argos
Lists of Roman Catholic bishops and archbishops
Frankokratia